Polynema striaticorne is a species of fairyfly. It parasitizes the eggs of the Buffalo treehopper.

References

Mymaridae